Platypelis barbouri is a species of frog in the family Microhylidae.
It is endemic to Madagascar.
Its natural habitats are subtropical or tropical moist lowland forests, subtropical or tropical moist montane forests, and heavily degraded former forest.
It is threatened by habitat loss.

References

Platypelis
Endemic frogs of Madagascar
Taxa named by Gladwyn Kingsley Noble
Taxonomy articles created by Polbot
Amphibians described in 1940
Taxobox binomials not recognized by IUCN